The Catalina Film Festival is an annual event that takes place at the end of September on Catalina Island, situated in Los Angeles County within the city of Avalon, California.

Founded by Festival Director [Ron Truppa], Catalina is known as "Hollywood's Island", as it is the only west coast resort island in the United States, situated in Los Angeles County.  Below a 6,200 person ballroom in the Avalon Casino, one of the main venues for the festival, the 1,154 seat Avalon Theater started construction in February 1928 to become the first sound theater ever built in the world by chewing gum-magnate William Wrigley, Jr. After its opening on May 29, 1929, Hollywood pioneers like Charlie Chaplin, Cecil B. DeMille and D. W. Griffith would come to Catalina just to screen their first "Talkie films." Marilyn Monroe lived on Catalina with her first husband during its World War II occupation.  The Chicago Cubs, owned by William Wrigley, Jr., who also owned the controlling interest in the Santa Catalina Island Company, held the Chicago Cubs spring training on the island for 30 years. In 1936 a young sports announcer named Ronald Reagan was discovered in Hollywood because he was in Catalina covering the spring training.  Because of that history, the Ronald Reagan Presidential Foundation honors his Hollywood legacy with an annual "Great Communicator" award at the festival along with other industry tributes given by the festival with the cooperation of the families of Charles Spencer Chaplin, with the Charlie Chaplin ICON Award, Stanley Kramer, with the Stanley Kramer Social Artist Award, along with other industry trophies established by the festival.  Many names in the entertainment business vacationed, filmed, or lived on Catalina over the past 100 years like Mack Sennett, Cary Grant, John Barrymore, Errol Flynn, Jayne Mansfield, Mickey Rooney, Natalie Wood, Robert Wagner, John Wayne, and so many more.

This non-profit organization and international film festival focuses on independent film, but also helps support the host island through its philanthropic efforts and beneficiary, the Catalina Island Conservancy.  As protectors of 88% of the island's natural habitat, the Conservancy is not only credited with the quickest recovery of any endangered species in the world, the Catalina Island fox, but it also takes care of all the plant, marine, and wildlife on and around the island.  The Conservancy gives out its own honor at the film festival, the ISLA Earth Award, focused on drawing attention to filmmakers and films that educated or project a message of conservation.

Past Industry Award Winners
2020

Martin Kove, Catalina Film’s Career Tribute Award

2019
Mira Sorvino, Avalon Award

2018
Richard Dryfuss, Stanley Kramer Social Artist Award

2016
Jamie King, Avalon Award
2015
Kristin Davis, Conservation Activist Award
F. Gary Gray, Stanley Kramer Social Artist Award
Mena Suvari, Avalon Award
Nicola Pedrozzi, Best Screenplay Award

2014
Nicolas Cage, Charlie Chaplin ICON Award for Joe
Andy Garcia, Ronald Reagan Great Communicator Award
William H. Macy, Stanley Kramer Social Artist Award
Emmy Rossum, Avalon Award

2013
Patricia Arquette, Career Tribute Award
Kate Bosworth, Avalon Award
Jon Favreau, Charlie Chaplin ICON Award
Bailee Madison, Catalina Crest Award
Tony Scott, Majestic Award
Sharon Stone, Stanley Kramer Social Artist Award

2012
Stan Lee, Ronald Reagan Great Communicator Award
Mark Rydell, Career Tribute Award
With Great Power: The Stan Lee Story (Filmmakers), Majestic Award

2011
Ed Begley, Jr., ISLA Earth Conservancy Award
Atlas Shrugged, Ronald Reagan Great Communicator Award

Past Filmmaker Awards
2018
Love Possibly (dir. Michael Boccalini & Che Grant), Best International Feature

2015
Loveband (written by Nicola Pedrozzi), Best Screenplay Award

2013
Yellow (dir. Nick Cassavetes), Best Feature

2012
Irvine Welsh's Ecstasy (dir. Rob Heydon), Best Feature

2011
Small Town Murder Songs, Best Feature
Denmark, Official Short Film Selection
Words Unspoken (dir. Renee O'Connor), Official Short Film Selection and Finalist
Samuel Bleak, (dir. Dustin Schuetter), Official Feature Film Selection and Finalist

References

External links 

Film festivals in California
Cinema of Southern California
Santa Catalina Island (California)
Organizations based in Los Angeles County, California